The McMinnville AVA is an American Viticultural Area located in Yamhill County, Oregon. It is entirely contained within the Willamette Valley AVA, roughly running from McMinnville to Sheridan. The AVA was created as a result of a successful petition from Kevin Byrd of Youngberg Hill Vineyards. Primarily uplifted marine sedimentary loams and silt, the top soil is shallow and relatively infertile.

References

External links 
 McMinnville AVA Winegrowers

American Viticultural Areas
Oregon wine
Geography of Yamhill County, Oregon
2005 establishments in Oregon